Evoken is an American funeral doom metal band from Lyndhurst, New Jersey, United States. Evoken is one of the earliest U.S. doom/death metal bands that are still active today, along with Novembers Doom and Rigor Sardonicous.

History

Founding years 
The band was founded by guitarist Nick Orlando under the name Funereus in April 1992. The original line-up consisted of Rob (bass/vocals), Nick (guitar), Phil (guitar) and Vince (drums). They recorded a rehearsal demo in 1992, which would be the only release under the Funereus name. After briefly changing their name to Asmodeus the following year, the band eventually decided upon the name Evoken in 1994 after several line-up changes. The name was taken from the Thergothon song found on the Fhtagn nagh Yog-Sothoth demo.

Reaching mainstream 
In 2003, Evoken headlined the Dutch Doomsday Festival during a brief European tour of the Netherlands, Belgium and the UK.

Evoken left Avantgarde Music of Italy after releasing two albums with the label and signed to Sweden's I Hate Records in January 2007.

Evoken returned to tour Europe in 2009, and again in 2011 for Roadburn Festival in the Netherlands.  The following year they signed to Canada's Profound Lore Records and performed on the inaugural Decibel Magazine tour in Baltimore, Philadelphia, and New York City.  2012 saw the release of their fifth full-length album Atra Mors, which was Profound Lore's 100th release.

Stylistic influences 
Evoken credits its main influences to be Australian band Disembowelment, England's Paradise Lost, the American band Winter, and the Finnish band Thergothon.

Members 
Current
 Vince Verkay – drums (1992–present)
 John Paradiso – guitar, vocals (1994–present), keyboards (1994, 2007), bass (2004–2007)
 Don Zaros – keyboards (2007–present)
 Dave Wagner – bass (2008–present)
 Chris Molinari – guitar (2009–present)
 Randy Cavanaugh – guitar (2018–present)

Former
 Nick Orlando – guitar (1992–2008), keyboards (2007)
 Phil Wilson – guitar (1992)
 Rob Robichaud – bass, vocals (1992–1993)
 Bill Manley – bass (1994–1996)
 Dario Derna – keyboards (1995–2002)
 Steve Moran – bass (1996–2004)
 Denny Hahn – keyboards (2003–2007)
 Craig Pillard – Bass, Keyboards (2007)

Session
 Charles Lamb – cello (1998)
 Suzanne Bass – cello (1999)
 Chris Kuffner – cello (2005)
 Craig Pillard – bass (2007)
 Brian Sanders – cello (2012)

Timeline

Discography

Studio albums 
 Embrace the Emptiness (1998)
 Quietus (2001)
 Antithesis of Light (2005)
 A Caress of the Void (2007)
 Atra Mors (2012)
 Hypnagogia (2018)

Demos 
 Demo 1992 (1992, as Funereus)
 Into the Autumn Shade (1992, as Funereus)
 Shades of Night Descending (1994)
 Promo '96 (1996)
 Promo 1997 (1997)
 Promo 2002 (2002)

Split album 
 Evoken/Beneath The Frozen Soil (2010)

Compilation album 
 A Caress of the Void/Omniscient (2018)

Single 
 Rotting Misery (2012)

References

External links 
 
 
 Evoken Interview

American death metal musical groups
American doom metal musical groups
Heavy metal musical groups from New Jersey
People from Lyndhurst, New Jersey
Musical groups established in 1992
Funeral doom musical groups